Hwanggang Dam is a hydroelectric dam on the Imjin River in Tosan County, North Korea. Construction began in 2002 and was completed in 2007. The stated aims of the project are to generate hydropower and provide water for crop irrigation.

In September 2009, without warning, North Korea released a massive amount of water from the dam, causing large floods in South Korea that killed six persons.

To protect itself against the perceived threat, South Korea built two dams in the area in the early 2010s.

References 

Energy infrastructure completed in 2007
Dams in North Korea
Dams completed in 2007
2007 establishments in North Korea
Buildings and structures in Kangwon Province